Assia Esther Wevill ( Gutmann; 15 May 1927 – 23 March 1969) was a German Jewish woman who escaped the Nazis at the beginning of World War II and emigrated to Palestine, via Italy, then later the United Kingdom, where she had an affair with the English poet Ted Hughes. While she was a successful advertising copywriter and a talented translator of poetry, she is mainly remembered in the context of her relationships with Sylvia Plath and Hughes.

Early life and marriages
Assia Gutmann was the daughter of a Jewish physician of Latvian origin, Lonya Gutmann, and a German Lutheran mother, Elisabeth "Lisa" (née Gaedeke). Her sister Celia was born on 22 September 1929. They escaped the Nazis at the beginning of World War II and immigrated to Palestine, now Israel. She spent most of her youth in Tel Aviv. Described by friends and family as a free-spirited young woman, she would go out to dance at the British soldiers' club, where she met Sergeant John Steele, with whom she moved to London in 1946 and who became her first husband in 1947. 

According to her biographers, Yehuda Koren and Eilat Negev, "she had entered an essentially loveless marriage with an Englishman at the age of 20 – largely to enable her family to immigrate to England." The couple later immigrated to Vancouver, Canada, where Assia enrolled at the University of British Columbia and met the man who would become her second husband, Canadian economist Richard Lipsey. Assia and Steele divorced in 1949 and she married Lipsey in 1952.

In 1956, on a ship to London, she met the 21-year-old Canadian poet David Wevill. They began an affair and Assia divorced Lipsey; she married Wevill in 1960.

Career
Assia was linguistically gifted. She had a successful career in advertising and was an aspiring poet who published, under her maiden name Assia Gutmann, an English translation of the work of Israeli poet Yehuda Amichai.

Ted Hughes
In 1961, poets Ted Hughes and Sylvia Plath rented their flat in Chalcot Square, Primrose Hill, London, to Assia and David Wevill, and took up residence at North Tawton, Devon. Hughes was immediately struck with Assia, as she was with him. He later wrote:

We didn't find her - she found us.
She sniffed us out...
She sat there...
Slightly filthy with erotic mystery...
I saw the dreamer in her
Had fallen in love with me and she did not know it.
That moment the dreamer in me
Fell in love with her, and I knew it.

Plath noted their chemistry. Soon afterward, Hughes and Assia began an affair. At the time of Plath's suicide, Assia was pregnant with Hughes's child, but she had an abortion soon after Plath's death. The actual relationship, who instigated it, and its circumstances, have been hotly debated for many years.

After Plath's suicide, Hughes moved Assia into Court Green (the Devon home at North Tawton he had bought with Plath), where Assia helped care for Hughes's and Plath's two children, Frieda and Nicholas. Assia was reportedly haunted by Plath's memory; she even began using things that had once belonged to Plath. In their biography of Assia, Lover of Unreason, Koren and Negev maintain that she used Plath's items not from obsession, but for the sake of practicality since she was maintaining a household for Hughes and his children. On 3 March 1965, at age 37, Assia gave birth to Alexandra Tatiana Elise, nicknamed Shura, while still married to David Wevill.

Ostracized by her lover's friends and family, and eclipsed by the figure of Plath in public life, Assia became anxious and suspicious of Hughes's infidelity, which was real enough. Hughes began affairs with Brenda Hedden, a married acquaintance who frequented their home, and Carol Orchard, a nurse 20 years his junior, whom he would later marry in 1970. Assia's relationship with Hughes was also fraught with other complexities, as shown by a collection of his letters to her acquired by Emory University. She was continually distraught by his reluctance to marry her and establish a home together, as well as his treatment of her as a "housekeeper". In his letter to Leonard Baskin on 16 July 1969, Hughes references Shura, his daughter with Wevill. He writes, "I have two nice children who make life a great pleasure.... I had a third, a little marvel, but she died with her mother."

Death
On 23 March 1969, Assia killed herself and four-year-old Shura in their London home at 3 Okeover Manor, Clapham Common. She had first sealed the kitchen door and window, then dissolved sleeping pills in a glass of water, chased with whisky, and then turned on the gas supply to the stove without lighting it. She and Shura were found by the family's German au pair, Else Ludwig, lying together on a mattress in the kitchen.

Legacy

In advertising
Assia composed the 90-second "Lost Island" advertisement for "Sea Witches" ladies' hair-dye product for both television and cinemas, called a "breakthrough in type" and a "huge success" by her biographers, Koren and Negev, that was "applauded in theaters." The advert can be viewed in some classic ad compilations or sometimes as an online posting.

In literature
Ted Hughes's volume of poetry Crow (1970) was dedicated to the memory of Assia and Shura.
His poem "Folktale" deals with his relationship with Assia:

She wanted the silent heraldry
Of the purple beach by the noble wall.
He wanted Cabala the ghetto demon
With its polythene bag full of ashes.

Hughes published half a dozen poems he had written for Assia, which were hidden among the total of 240 in New Selected Poems (1989).
In "The Error." he wrote:

When her grave opened its ugly mouth
why didn't you just fly,
Why did you kneel down at the grave's edge
to be identified
accused and convicted?

In "The Descent", he wrote:

your own hands, stronger than your choked outcry,
Took your daughter from you. She was stripped from you,
The last raiment
Clinging round your neck, the sole remnant
Between you and the bed
In the underworld

Assia appears as "Helen" in Fay Weldon's novel Down Among the Women (1971).

In film and television
 In the feature film Sylvia (2003), Assia is portrayed by Amira Casar.
 In October 2015, the BBC Two documentary Ted Hughes: Stronger Than Death examined Hughes's life and work, and included an examination of the part played by Assia.

References

Further reading
  Extract from Chapter 8 - Devon
Goodspeed-Chadwick, Julie. Reclaiming Assia Wevill: Sylvia Plath, Ted Hughes, and the Literary Imagination. LSU Press, 2019.
Goodspeed-Chadwick, Julie and Peter K. Steinberg (eds.). The Collected Writings of Assia Wevill. LSU Press, 2021.

External links 
 Stuart A. Rose Manuscript, Archives, and Rare Book Library, Emory University: Letters to Assia Wevill, 1955-1970

1927 births
1969 deaths
1969 suicides
British emigrants to Canada
Filicides in England
German emigrants to Canada
German people of Russian-Jewish descent
Jewish emigrants from Nazi Germany to Mandatory Palestine
Murder–suicides in the United Kingdom
Naturalised citizens of the United Kingdom
People from Berlin
People from Tel Aviv
Suicides by carbon monoxide poisoning
Suicides in Greater London
Ted Hughes